Harry Bollman (15 September 1902 – 19 December 1984) was a former Australian rules footballer who played with Footscray in the Victorian Football League (VFL).

Notes

External links 
		

1902 births
1984 deaths
Australian rules footballers from Victoria (Australia)
Western Bulldogs players
Yarraville Football Club players